The 1964 Individual Speedway World Championship was the 19th edition of the official World Championship to determine the world champion rider.

New Zealander Barry Briggs secured his third world title with a five race 15 point maximum. Igor Plekhanov the Soviet Union captain won the silver medal after winning the ride off against four times champion Ove Fundin.

First round
Scandinavian Qualifying - 16 to Nordic Final
Continental Qualifying - 16 to Continental Final

Scandinavian Qualifying

Continental Qualifying

Second round
British & Commonwealth Qualifying - 16 to British & Commonwealth Final
Scandinavian Final - 8 to European Final
Continental Final - 8 to European Final

British & Commonwealth Qualifying

Nordic Final
June 14, 1964
 Odense
 First 8 to European Final plus 1 reserve

Continental Final
 June 20, 1964
  Slany
 First 8 to European Final plus 1 reserve

Third round
British & Commonwealth Final - 8 to World Final
European Final - 8 to World Final

British & Commonwealth Final
August 29, 1964
 Wembley
 First 8 to World Final plus 1 reserve

European Final
June 28, 1964
 Wroclaw
 First 8 to World Final plus 1 reserve

World Final
September 11, 1964
 Göteborg, Ullevi

References

1964
World Individual
World
Speedway competitions in Poland